Japan wax (木蝋 Mokurō), also known as sumac wax, sumach wax, vegetable wax, China green tallow, and Japan tallow, is a pale-yellow, waxy, water-insoluble solid with a gummy feel, obtained from the berries of certain sumacs native to Japan and China, such as Toxicodendron vernicifluum (lacquer tree) and Toxicodendron succedaneum (Japanese wax tree).

Japan wax is a byproduct of lacquer manufacture. The fruits of the Toxicodendron trees are harvested, steamed, and pressed for the waxy substance which hardens when cool. It is not a true wax but a fat that contains 95% palmitin.   Japan wax is sold in flat squares or disks and has a rancid odor.  It is extracted by expression and heat, or by the action of solvents.

Uses 
Japan wax is used in candles, furniture polishes, floor waxes, wax matches, soaps, food packaging, pharmaceuticals, cosmetics, pastels, crayons, buffing compounds, metal lubricants, adhesives, thermoplastic resins, and as a substitute for beeswax. Because it undergoes rancidification, it is not often used in foods.

Properties 
Specific gravity ≈ 0.975
Soluble in benzene, ether, naphtha and alkalis; insoluble in water and cold ethanol.
Iodine value = 4.5–12.6
Acid value = 6–209
Saponification value = 220

References

Waxes
Non-timber forest products